Angelo da Vallombrosa or Angelus Anachorita Vallombrosa (1455–1530) was an Italian jurist and abbot.

Life 
He was a counsellor of the Roman Rota and was ordained on January 15, 1488 in the monastery of S. Prassede (Rome), by the general of the Vallumbrosan Order, Biagio Milanesi.

He was appointed vicar at the pieve Montemignaio (Toscany) and the santa Cecilia della Corvara abbay in Bologna

He then obtained the Perpetual Vicar of the Montemignaio Pieve in Tuscany, and the Abbey of Santa Cecilia of Corvara near Bologna, but settled in Vallombrosa (Florence) in 1496.

He wrote numerous invectives, many of which against Girolamo Savonarola theories.

When he died in 1530, Ilario Alcei wrote an epigram in couplet that was engraved on his grave.

Works

References 

15th-century Italian jurists
Italian abbots
1455 births
1530 deaths
16th-century Italian jurists
15th-century Italian writers
16th-century Italian writers
16th-century male writers